The 1928 LFF Lyga was the 7th season of the LFF Lyga football competition in Lithuania.  KSS Klaipėda won the championship.

Kaunas Group

Klaipėda Group

North Division

South Division

Klaipėda Group Final
KSS Klaipėda beat Sportverein Pagėgiai

Šiauliai Group
LDS Šiauliai 6-0 Kraft Šiauliai
ŠSK Šiauliai - Makabi Šiauliai
LDS Šiauliai 5-1 SSK Šiauliai

Final
KSS Klaipėda 3-1 LFLS Kaunas

(Šiauliai Champion didn't arrive to Klaipėda.)

References
RSSSF

LFF Lyga seasons
Lith
Lith
1